In Greek mythology, Orphne (from ), also known as Styx or Gorgyra (from ), was a nymph that lived in Hades. With Acheron, she mothered Ascalaphus.

Orphne also seems to be one translation of the name of the Roman goddess Caligo (Darkness).

Notes

References 
 Apollodorus, Apollodorus. The Library, Volume I: Books 1-3.9, translated by James G. Frazer, Loeb Classical Library No. 121, Cambridge, Massachusetts, Harvard University Press, 1921. . Online version at Harvard University Press. Online version at the Perseus Digital Library.
 Fontenrose, Joseph Eddy (1959), Python: A Study of Delphic Myth and Its Origins, University of California Press, 1959. . Google Books.
 Ovid, Metamorphoses, edited and translated by Brookes More, Boston, Cornhill Publishing Co., 1922. Online version at the Perseus Digital Library. Online version at ToposText.

Nymphs